Gianluigi Galli (born 13 January 1973), better known as Gigi Galli, is an Italian rally driver, best known for his spectacular driving style. He comes from, and lives in Livigno, Italy.

Career

Galli debuted in the World Rally Championship at the 1998 San Remo Rally with a Group N Mitsubishi Carisma GT. His first world rally with a WRC car was the 2004 Monte Carlo Rally. In 2005, Galli drove for Mitsubishi and competed in 13 events with a Mitsubishi Lancer WRC05. He finished 11th in the drivers' world championship. In 2006, he drove a Peugeot 307 WRC in six world rallies. He achieved his first podium place by finishing third in the Rally Argentina.

In the 2007 season, he competed in three rallies with a Citroën Xsara WRC for the Italian privateer outfit Aimont Racing. His best result was sixth at the Rally Norway.

In 2008 Galli drove for the Stobart Ford team in all rounds of the WRC, replacing Jari-Matti Latvala. His first outing with the new team, after 10 months of absence in the series was quite successful - Galli managed to score 3 points in the drivers' and manufacturers' championship by finishing sixth overall. The Italian had some problems with the power steering on day two which cost him over a minute, but he was able to keep a good position. In Sweden, after three days of consistent pace, Galli equalled his best WRC result, finishing third and scoring another 6 points, which gave him fourth position in drivers' championship after two rounds.

After Rally Finland, Galli was eighth in the drivers' championship, only three points behind teammate Henning Solberg. However, at the following event, the Rallye Deutschland, Galli crashed heavily fracturing his left femur. As the recovery was expected to take five months, Galli would miss the five last rallies of the season.

Results

Complete World Rally Championship results

Complete FIA World Rallycross Championship results
Supercar

References

External links 

 

1973 births
Living people
Sportspeople from the Province of Sondrio
Italian rally drivers
World Rally Championship drivers
World Rallycross Championship drivers
M-Sport drivers